is a 1986 Family Computer action adventure game by Konami. It was released only in Japan and based on the movie of the same year, King Kong Lives (King Kong 2 being the film's title in Japan).

Plot
After being shot down from the World Trade Center, Kong is kept alive in a coma for about ten years. When another Kong-sized female gorilla is found, a blood transfusion is arranged from the female and an artificial heart is installed inside Kong. With a functioning heart, Kong escapes from the facility and seeks to procreate with the female Kong still held in captivity.

Gameplay

The player assumes the role of King Kong, who is in search of his female ape companion, Lady Kong, who is in captivity. The player must travel through nine different maze-like worlds consisting of military facilities, mountain ranges, jungles
, cities and underground locations. The entire game takes place at an overhead view. He must destroy enemies and landscapes by punching, stomping, and throwing giant rocks as projectiles. Some of these enemies include robots, blob creatures, and even large animals. By destroying the landscape in all of these worlds, various hidden items and doorways can be uncovered in the process. Power-ups can increase Kong's maximum life (hit points) as well as the maximum amount of rocks he can hold. There are also power-ups which will make his rock projectile more powerful, increase his speed, and even make him temporarily invincible. Doorways, hidden all over each world, will either transport Kong to another location within the world or to another world completely. These doorways, which on some occasions do not need to be uncovered, are the only means to reaching different worlds in the game. Other doorways contain rooms with hidden power-ups or a world's boss.

The player must find and defeat each of the bosses in the game's first eight worlds to which they will yield a key. When all eight keys are collected, the player can enter a large door in world 9, which holds the game's final boss and rescue Kong's love.

The player is given three lives to complete the game, with a sparing amount of opportunities to gain extra lives and no continues. Once the player memorizes where power-ups, doors and boss locations are sited, the game is made considerably shorter to complete.

External links

1986 video games
King Kong (franchise) video games
Konami games
Nintendo Entertainment System games
Nintendo Entertainment System-only games
Japan-exclusive video games
Video games scored by Kinuyo Yamashita
Video games scored by Kiyohiro Sada
Video games developed in Japan